Quack Pack is an American animated sitcom produced by Walt Disney Television Animation, featuring Donald Duck and his nephews. The show debuted on September 3, 1996, as a part of the "Disney Afternoon" programming block, following the success of Goof Troop. The series ran for one season with 39 episodes.

Plot
The show centers around Donald and adolescent versions of his nephews Huey, Dewey, and Louie. Donald works as a cameraman alongside Daisy, who is a reporter. The group travel around the world looking for a big scoop.

Huey, Dewey and Louie have more distinctive personalities than when they had been presented as younger. They usually resort to extreme and strange measures to avoid getting into trouble with their uncle and to achieve their ambitions. They usually do this by tricking Donald, or whoever else they wish to manipulate, but they usually feel guilty about it. Huey, Dewey and Louie share similar passions such as listening to rock music, getting revenge on those who anger them, impressing girls, getting money, pulling pranks, playing games and reading comics. They also share a profound knowledge of cars and mechanics.

Characters
Huey (voiced by Jeannie Elias) usually acts as the leader of the three brothers. Huey has a strong belief that the concepts of fate and coincidence are somehow mysteriously linked together. This makes Huey possess a more persevering character than his brothers as he is usually the last to give up trying to get something when the trio want anything. Huey is also the lothario among the boys. Huey is the oldest of the triplets.
Dewey (voiced by Pamela Adlon) is usually the most level-headed out of the three boys. Even though the trio love practical jokes, Dewey is the main practical joker and considers himself a master prankster. It is his good knowledge of technology that make him an impressive prankster such as his understanding of projectors to create ghosts and fog machines to create a more spooky atmosphere. Dewey is the middle child of the trio.
Louie (voiced by E. G. Daily) is a huge fan of comic books and sports – more so than his brothers, with his favorite comic book hero being Mantis Boy. Unlike his brothers, Louie is a nature and animal lover, in addition to being the more kinder of his siblings. Louie is the youngest of the brothers.
Donald Duck (voiced by Tony Anselmo) is Huey, Dewey and Louie's uncle/guardian who refer to him as "Uncle D" if not Uncle Donald. All of them live together in Donald's house. He is also Daisy's boyfriend and cameraman for her T.V. show. He is notoriously well known for being fiery-tempered and impatient. He is an especially notorious prankster. Despite this, Donald tries to be a good parental figure and is sometimes less than willing to trust Huey, Dewey and Louie. However, he has shown that he deeply cares about them and is very protective of them. He portrays himself as a father figure towards them and regards them as his boys.
Daisy Duck (voiced by Kath Soucie) is Donald's girlfriend and the reporter of a T.V. show called What In the World, working for Kent Powers. She does everything she can to try and get a story, sometimes even to the extent of intentionally putting others in danger. She has a blue pet iguana named Knuckles who eats almost anything. Daisy cares a lot about Huey, Dewey and Louie and is willing to trust them more than Donald does as he often believes they are up to no good – although Donald's often right. Daisy is a mother figure to Huey, Dewey and Louie. She puts up with Donald's antics as well, which are often dodgy and impulsive.
Kent Powers (voiced by Roger Rose) is a narcissistic TV personality, Kent Powers is the boss of both Daisy and Donald, the latter of which he frequently bullies for so little as a cheap laugh. Although Donald is specifically employed as his cameraman, Kent specifically makes Donald his personal assistant without paying him any extra. Despite his popular image, he is egocentric, selfish, untrustworthy, aloof, domineering and mean-spirited, but unlike Donald has no positive qualities. Kent hates Donald, and eagerly takes every opportunity to try and fire him unless there's a good reason not to.
Ludwig Von Drake (voiced by Corey Burton) is Donald's uncle and Duckburg's resident genius and inventor. Donald and the boys often visit Ludwig when they need his advice or gadgets, though they tend to make matters worse for those involved.
Gwumpki (voiced by Pat Fraley) is an immigrant from a country called Gladismorkia, he is friends of Donald, Daisy, Huey, Dewey and Louie and owner of the local restaurant where the boys loiter in. He is generally kind-hearted, though gets angry when the topic of the boys' unpaid tab is brought up.
Knuckles is Daisy's pet iguana.
The Claw (voiced by Frank Welker) is an intimidating criminal named for the metal claw replacing his hand. The Claw first appears in "Ready, Aim... Duck!" when Donald claims that he was responsible for breaking the triplets' virtual reality helmet (in reality, Donald himself was the one who broke it). This causes The Claw to seek out Donald in anger. In his second appearance, "Long Arm of the Claw", the Claw reappears as a fully rehabilitated "good citizen". However, he relapses back into his violent nature whenever he sees gold and calms down only when he hears the sound of a ringing bell.
Moltoc (voiced by Tim Curry) is a sneaky European villain with world domination intents, who tries to do so by stealing a golden orb in "Recipe for Adventure" and finding a buried treasure in "Hit the Road, Backwater Jack".
The Zalcrovian Overlord (ZO) is an alien overlord whose plans to take over Earth were accidentally foiled by Donald in "The Late Donald Duck" and returns in "The Return of the T-Squad" for revenge.
Dr. Horton Letrek (Jeff Bennett) is a mad scientist who in "Island of the Not So Nice" invented a ray that turns lifeforms into prehistoric versions of themselves and in "Heavy Dental" invented a mind-control device.
 Susie McIder (voiced by Tara Strong).

Episodes

Production 
Co-producers Kevin Crosby Hopps and Toby Shelton turned to Donald Duck shorts for inspiration for Quack Pack. Shelton noted that in the shorts, Donald mostly interacted with humans, and decided to incorporate humans into the world of Quack Pack. This contrasted with DuckTales, a previous Disney Afternoon series, where the world is inhabited by other anthropomorphic animals. Shelton considers Quack Pack as more of an extension of the original Donald Duck shorts than of DuckTales. Because of this, many characters from the DuckTales cartoons and comics, including Disney characters, such as Scrooge McDuck, Launchpad McQuack, and Mickey Mouse don't appear in the series, although Ludwig Von Drake does make a couple of appearances.

In the show, the previously interchangeable nephews were given their own voices and personalities. Huey was the smooth-talker and schemer, Louie was the athlete and oddball, and Dewey was the intellectual and prankster.

The original title of the show was Duck Daze, but was changed to Quack Pack before release. There are still references to Duck Daze in the theme song.

Release 
After Quack Pack left the Disney Afternoon block and following the launch of Disney's One Saturday Morning on ABC, it eventually resurfaced in reruns on Disney Channel, and later on Toon Disney. The show was removed from the channel's line up along with several other Disney shows in November 2004.

This show currently airs on Disney Junior in Turkey, Netherlands, Flanders, Japan, and Southern Africa, on Disney Channel in Germany, India, Mexico, Poland and Turkey, and Disney XD in Scandinavia and Latin America.

All episodes of the series are currently available on the Disney+ streaming service.

Home media

VHS releases
In the summer of 1997, three 45-minute VHS cassettes containing six episodes were released in the United States.

DVD releases

United States
The episodes "Transmission: Impossible", "Heavy Dental" and "Feats of Clay" were released as the first Region 1 volume Quack Pack: Volume 1 in the United States on February 14, 2006.

International
A one-off Christmas special compilation DVD titled Disney's Christmas Favourites was released in Region 2 on October 31, 2005, and contains the Quack Pack episode "Snow Place to Hide", along with the Mickey Mouse Works short segment "Mickey's Mixed Nuts", the 101 Dalmatians: The Series episode "A Christmas Cruella", and the short Toy Tinkers.

Reception

Critical reception 
Zach Gass of Screen Rant called Quack Pack one of the "classic Disney cartoons," writing, "It's not the most original idea, but it's definitely an animated '90s time capsule. With its choice of design, dialogue, and certain plot devices, it's unarguably a product of its time, for better and for worse." Catherine Hug of CBR.com said, "While Quack Pack only had one season in 1996, it featured the hilarious antics of Donald Duck and his three nephews, Huey, Dewey, and Louie. While Donald tried working as a TV Cameraman, he also had to watch over his three rebellious nephews." Susana Polo of Polygon stated, "Quack Pack wasn’t all bad ideas. Like our modern DuckTales reboot, it seized upon the idea of giving Huey, Dewey and Louie differentiated personalities."

Legacy 
Quack Pack served as inspiration for the 2017 DuckTales episode of the same name, wherein the main characters find themselves trapped in a 1990s sitcom and are forced to contend with the human studio audience, which they view as monsters since humans are not part of the series.

Notes

References

External links 

 Official Website
 
 
 Quack Pack at Don Markstein's Toonopedia. Archived from the original on November 4, 2016
 
 Quack Pack at MickeyMouseAthletics.com

1990s American animated television series
1990s American sitcoms
1996 American television series debuts
1996 American television series endings
American animated sitcoms
American animated television spin-offs
American children's animated adventure television series
Disney Channel original programming
Donald Duck television series
English-language television shows
First-run syndicated television programs in the United States
Animated television series about families
Animated television series about brothers
Television series by Disney Television Animation
The Disney Afternoon
Television shows set in the United States
Television shows set in Europe
Television shows set in Russia
Television shows set in Canada
Television shows set in China
Television shows set in Mexico
Television shows set in Africa